The 1997 WAC Championship Game was a college football game played on Saturday, December 6, 1997, at Sam Boyd Stadium in Whitney, Nevada. This was the 2nd and penultimate WAC Championship Game and determined the 1997 champion of the Western Athletic Conference. The game featured the New Mexico Lobos, champions of the Mountain division, and the Colorado State Rams, champions of the Pacific division. Colorado State would win the game 41–13.

Teams

Colorado State

New Mexico

Game summary

Statistics

References

Championship
WAC Championship Game
Colorado State Rams football games
New Mexico Lobos football games
December 1997 sports events in the United States
1997 in sports in Nevada